Anatoliy Mykhailovych Mushchynka (born 19 August 1970) is a retired Ukrainian and German professional footballer. He is the author of the very first goal of Ukrainian Premier League.

Mushchynka played only one game for Ukraine against Israel on 27 April 1993 in Odessa.

References

External links

1970 births
Living people
People from Mukachevo
Soviet footballers
Ukrainian footballers
Ukraine international footballers
Association football midfielders
FC SKA-Karpaty Lviv players
FC Dynamo Kyiv players
FC Karpaty Lviv players
FC Metalurh Zaporizhzhia players
FC 08 Homburg players
1. FC Saarbrücken players
SV Röchling Völklingen players
Ukrainian Premier League players
Ukrainian expatriate footballers
Expatriate footballers in Germany
Ukrainian expatriate sportspeople in Germany
Ukrainian emigrants to Germany
Sportspeople from Zakarpattia Oblast